Zhou Chaomin (born 18 March 1998) is a Chinese badminton player. In 2016, she won the silver medal at the Asia Junior Championships in the girls' doubles event partnered with Ni Bowen. In 2017, she became the runner-up at the China International Challenge tournament in the women's doubles event partnered with Chen Lu.

Achievements

Asian Junior Championships 
Girls' doubles

BWF World Tour (1 runner-up) 
The BWF World Tour, which was announced on 19 March 2017 and implemented in 2018, is a series of elite badminton tournaments sanctioned by the Badminton World Federation (BWF). The BWF World Tour is divided into levels of World Tour Finals, Super 1000, Super 750, Super 500, Super 300, and the BWF Tour Super 100.

Mixed doubles

BWF International Challenge/Series (1 title, 1 runner-up) 
Women's doubles

Mixed doubles

  BWF International Challenge tournament
  BWF International Series tournament

References

External links 
 

1998 births
Living people
Badminton players from Guangdong
Chinese female badminton players
21st-century Chinese women